Stanislav Stanojevic is a film director, screenwriter and French actor born 27 December 1938 in Belgrade, Serbia. He lives in Paris since 1966 and is also a writer.

Filmography
Director
1971 : Le Journal d'un suicidé (with Sami Frey, Delphine Seyrig, Marie-France Pisier, Gabrielle Robinne)
1979 : Subversion
1984 : Illustres Inconnus
2007 : Mauve, le Tigre !

Screenwriter
1971 : Le Journal d'un suicidé

Acteur
1971 : Le Journal d'un suicidé

References 

Serbian film directors
French film directors
French male screenwriters
French screenwriters
Serbian emigrants to France
1938 births
Film people from Belgrade
Living people